Stephen Monteith (born September 21, 1943, in Stratford, Ontario) is an ice hockey player who played for the Canadian national team. He won a bronze medal at the 1968 Winter Olympics.

References

External links 

1943 births
Canadian ice hockey forwards
Ice hockey players at the 1968 Winter Olympics
Living people
Olympic bronze medalists for Canada
Olympic ice hockey players of Canada
Olympic medalists in ice hockey
Sportspeople from Stratford, Ontario
Ice hockey people from Ontario
Medalists at the 1968 Winter Olympics
Toronto Neil McNeil Maroons players
Toronto Varsity Blues ice hockey players
University of Toronto people